Corbacho may refer to:

 Celestino Corbacho (1949-), a Spanish politician
 José Corbacho (1965-), a Spanish humorist film director
 Alberto Corbacho (1984-), a Spanish basketball player